Events from the year 1332 in the Kingdom of Scotland.

Incumbents
Monarch –  David II

Events
 2 August –  Domhnall II, Earl of Mar elected as the new Regent of Scotland at a meeting of the nobles at Perth
 6 August – Battle of Wester Kinghorn sees victory for forces supporting Edward Balliol
 10–11 August: Battle of Dupplin Moor, decisive victory for supporters of Edward Balliol
 16 December – Battle of Annan, decisive victory for Bruce loyalist forces, ejecting Balliol from Scotland

Deaths 
 20 July – Thomas Randolph, 1st Earl of Moray, Regent of Scotland (born 1278)
 11 August – Muireadhach III, Earl of Menteith at Battle of Dupplin Moor
 11 August – Robert II Keith, Marischal of Scotland at Battle of Dupplin Moor
 11 August – Thomas Randolph, 2nd Earl of Moray at Battle of Dupplin Moor

See also

 Timeline of Scottish history

References

 
Years of the 14th century in Scotland
Wars of Scottish Independence